Choiyoi Group is a Permian and Triassic-aged group of volcano-sedimentary formations in Argentina and Chile. The group bears evidence of bimodal-style volcanism related to an  ancient subduction zone that existed along the western margin of the supercontinent Gondwana.

While the subsurface extent of the group is large, exposures in Argentina are most common in the Frontal Cordillera, the San Rafael Massif and the Principal Cordillera of southern Mendoza and northern Neuquén. In parts the group reaches thicknesses of 2 to 4 km.

The plutonic equivalent of the Choiyoi Group volcanic material are mostly granitoids. The remnants of the magmatic arc that produced much of volcanic material is now preserved as a series of batholiths, including the Coastal Batholith of central Chile in the Chilean Coast Range.

Many Triassic basins in southern South America, including Cuyo Basin, have their lowermost sections made up of Choiyoi Group formations.

Stratigraphy 
The Choiyoi Group can be stratigraphically subdivided into a Lower Choiyoi Group and an Upper Choiyoi Group.

In the Lower Choiyoi Group basaltic lava flows, andesites and breccias are common. Volcanic rocks and sediments in the Lower Choiyoi Group belong to the calc-alkaline magma series and have also other geochemical signatures indicative of an origin in subduction zone volcanism. Volcanic rocks of the Lower Choiyoi in La Pampa and westernmost Buenos Aires Province have shoshonitic and syenitic features. Part of the Lower Choiyoi Group were erupted in association with the San Rafael orogeny while some Choiyoi Group sediments were deformed by the same orogeny.

Rhyolitic ignimbrites and lavas are more common in the Upper Choiyoi Group.

The Choiyoi Group include the following formations:
 El Palque, San Juan Province
 Horcajos, San Juan Province, Mendoza Province
 Portezuelo del Cenizo, San Juan Province, Mendoza Province
 Tambillos, Mendoza Province. This formation contains Sphenophyte fossils that are thought to have grown near an ancient lake.
 Vega de Los Machos, San Juan Province

Notes

References 

Volcanic groups
Geologic groups of South America
Geologic formations of Argentina
Geologic formations of Chile
Permian System of South America
Permian Argentina
Permian Chile
Permian volcanism
Triassic System of South America
Triassic Argentina
Triassic Chile
Triassic volcanism
Formations